Lac de Saint-Pée-sur-Nivelle is a lake located in Pyrénées-Atlantiques, Nouvelle-Aquitaine, France. Its surface area is 0.12 km²

Lakes of Pyrénées-Atlantiques